= J. Van Drongelen 1 =

Dutch steam locomotive

J. Van Drongelen 1 was a locomotive built by Crenstein, serial number 6398, in 1914 for construction company J. Van Drongelen in Hoek (The Netherlands). The locomotive was engaged in the construction of the Zeeuwsch-Vlaamsche Tramweg-Maatschappij (ZVTM) lines, until its sale in 1917 to the Centrale Limburgsche Spoorweg (CLS). It remained in service until 1921 and was sold in 1924.
